Kim Tae-Min  (Hangul: 김태민; born 25 May 1982) is a South Korean footballer who last played for Kitchee.

Summary 
Kim was known as the fastest Korean player He was the symbol of the 'Diligence' in K-league based on his experience. He played for Gangwon F.C. which valued his experience and diligence highly and they considered him to be the replacement for Lee Eul-Yong, the legend player of South Korea National Team . He is a defensive midfielder.

Kim transferred to China League One side Chongqing F.C. in February 2013.

Career statistics

References

External links 

Kim Tae-min at HKFA

1982 births
Living people
South Korean footballers
South Korean expatriate footballers
Busan IPark players
Jeju United FC players
Gimcheon Sangmu FC players
Gangwon FC players
K League 1 players
China League One players
Expatriate footballers in China
South Korean expatriate sportspeople in China
Expatriate footballers in Thailand
Hong Kong Premier League players
Kitchee SC players
Expatriate footballers in Hong Kong
Association football midfielders